Sheikh Mansur ("The-Victorious"; born Mansur Ushurma, Mansur Ucherman; 2 June 1762 – 13 April 1794) was a Chechen military commander and Islamic leader who fought for Chechnya and Circassia. He was influential in the resistance against Catherine the Great's imperialist expansion into the Caucasus during the late 18th century. Sheikh Mansur is considered the first leader of the resistance in North Caucasus against Russian imperialism. He remains a hero of the Chechen and North Caucasian peoples in general, and their struggle for independence.

Biography
Mansur Ushurma was born in the aul of Aldi (today a suburb of Grozny) in the region of Chechnya, centered in the Sunja River valley. Later on, he ventured to the Dagestan hill country for education, eventually settling for a madrasa following the Naqshbandi school of Sufi Islam.

In 1784, Sheikh Mansur, now a clouted imam, journeyed back to Chechnya and became upset with the Russian encroachment in the North Caucasus. He ordered the remaining non-Muslim Chechens to stop practicing many of their old pagan traditions with the cult of the dead and to stop smoking tobacco and drinking alcohol. He also influenced Islamic concepts into social conventions (adat) and preached them to attempt Islamic unity. This was not easy in a land where people had lived under ancient traditions, customs and religions. Islamic tradition in Chechnya, especially in the mountainous areas, was not as strong as it was in Dagestan. But the holy war that he declared was an attempt at unity among the Chechen teips.

As Mansur's message became popular with the Chechen people, the Russian Empire attempted to discredit him and ultimately arrest him. In 1785, the Russians sent a punitive expedition of up to 5,000 soldiers to his home in Aldi, only to find the village bare and desolate. Angered, the Russian troops plundered and burned the village to the ground. Upon returning to Aldi with others, Mansur proclaimed a holy war (gazavat) against the Russians. Soon, Chechen fighters won the Battle of the Sunja, killing and taking hundreds of Russian soldiers captive. After that, Sheikh Mansur rallied resistance fighters from Dagestan through Kabardia. Most of the forces were young Chechen and Dagestani men numbering more than 12,000 by December 1785. However, Mansur suffered a defeat when he tried to infiltrate Russian territory and failed to seize the fort of Kizlyar.

After this, the Russian people refortified their settlements and the Russian Empress Catherine the Great withdrew her forces from Georgia to the Terek River line. In 1786, Russian forces abandoned the new fort of Vladikavkaz, and would not occupy it again until 1803. From 1787 to 1791, during the Russian-Turkish War, Sheikh Mansur moved to the northwestern Caucasus region of Circassia, strengthening Islamic practice there. He led the Circassians and Nogais in assaults against Russian forces.

In June 1791, Sheikh Mansur was captured at the Ottoman fortress of Anapa on the Black Sea when it came under siege. He was brought to Saint Petersburg and imprisoned for life. In April 1794, he died at the Shlisselburg Fortress.

Appearance

Description by Russian historian Prozitelev:

Description by the 3rd Imam of the Caucasian Imamate Imam Shamil:

Legacy
The Chechens and Circassians still honor him as a national leader.
Sheikh Mansur was the subject of two Romantic novels in the mid-19th century, one in Russian by V. I. Savinov and one in English by E. Spencer.
Akhmat Kadyrov Square was formerly named after Sheikh Mansur until 1996.
Many songs have been dedicated to Sheikh Mansur, e.g. by artists such as Timur Mutsurayev, Turpal Djabrailov, Hasmagomed Hadjimuradov and Rizavdi Ismailov.
Streets have been named after Sheikh Mansur, inter alia, in the Dagestani city, Khasavyurt.
Sheikh Mansur belonged to the Elistanzkhoy teip and was married to Chachi with whom he had three children at the time of his arrest - a son Yasa (8 years old), and two daughters Ragmet (4 years old) and Namet (a year old). The descendants of Sheikh Mansur also took a Y-DNA test which showed a typical Elistanzkhoy Y-DNA result in L-M20.
The Sheikh Mansur Battalion, fighting on the Ukrainian side in the Russian armed aggression against Ukraine.

See also

 Caucasian Imamate
 Russo-Circassian War
 Caucasian War

References 

The story of Sheik Mansur and other myths of the Caucases

1794 deaths
Chechen people
Chechen politicians
Chechen warlords
People of the Chechen wars
Sunni imams
Sunni Sufis
1732 births
North Caucasian independence activists
People of the Caucasian War
Circassian military personnel of the Russo-Circassian War